Sheridan Products Inc. was an American air gun manufacturing company. It was purchased by the Benjamin Air Rifle Company in 1977, and later purchased by Crosman in 1994.

Company history
Sheridan Products Inc. was formed to produce Pneumatic Air Pellet Rifles  with production beginning in March 1947. In the early 1940s Co-founder Ed Wackerhagen, dissatisfied with a pellet gun used by his son, set out to build one of the finest airguns in history. The design was to incorporate the philosophy: "Performance is the sum total of many small functions whose combined result must spell 'Bulls-eye'". It was to be called the Model A, also known as the "Super Grade". This air gun was to fill the gap between the "BB" gun and the .22 caliber. A successful prototype was produced mid-1944 and in 1945, in partnership with I.R. "Bob" Kraus, Sheridan Products Inc. was born in Racine, Wisconsin. The name Sheridan was reputedly in honor of the Civil War's General Philip Sheridan.

The Sheridan Model A "Super Grade" was introduced in 1947 and is considered one of the finest air rifles ever produced. Unfortunately its high cost (MSRP $56.50), translated to very slow sales. Within a year, it was decided that a cheaper model was needed, and in 1948 the Model B "Sporter" was born. Designed to be less expensive than the Model A, it had a MSRP of $35 when introduced. Apparently the price point of the Model B was still too high, and sales continue to be slow on both rifles, which was of great concern to the newly formed Sheridan Company. It was quickly realized that for the company to survive, a much cheaper to produce model must be designed. This philosophy gave rise to the last Sheridan model, the Model C "Streak" introduced in 1949. Its MSRP at introduction was $19.95 and was selling for $23.95 by 1950. This is the model that ushered Sheridan Products Inc. into profitability. The Model C Silver and Blue Streaks are the pellet rifles that Sheridan is primarily known for, since the Model A's and B's are relatively scarce. Sheridan manufactured the Model C Streaks for 27 years before being bought out by the Benjamin Air Rifle company and ending the original run of Sheridan produce Streaks. Many small changes were made to the Streaks during its 27-year run, providing collectors many different varieties.

Sheridan was purchased by the Benjamin Air Rifle Company in 1977.  That company was later purchased by Crosman in 1994.

Products
All Sheridan air rifles Model A, B, and C are multi-pump, single shot, bolt action, breech-loading, and .20 (5mm) caliber. Muzzle velocity figures are for Sheridan's standard weight pellets of 14.3 grains.)

Model A (Super) (1947–1953) Total Production: 2130 Velocity: Variable to 700 fps. With a large cast and machined aluminum receiver, bronzed barrel and pump tube, walnut stock with Monte Carlo cheek-piece, ball-type valve mechanism, adjustable trigger, and peep sight. It weighed 5 pounds 14 ounces, stretched 37 inches overall, with a 20-inch barrel with one turn in 12 inches.  MSRP $56.50.

Model B (Sporter) (1948–1951) Total Production: 1051  Velocity: Variable to 700 fps Designed to be less expensive than the Model A (Super) Using the same gun, but without the cheek-piece, a revision of soldered ventilated rib type barrel, less expensive paint finish and various slight changes it was to be a cheaper alternative to the slow selling Model A. MSRP $35 when introduced, $42.50 when production stopped.

Model C (Streak) (1949–1976) Total Production: Unknown. Velocity: Variable to 700 fps. Designed to be less costly to produce than the Model A (Super) and the Model B (Sporter).  Although less costly to produce when compared to the Super and Sporter Grade, the Model C were still well constructed Airguns using quality materials. They  utilized walnut stocks, aluminum receiver, bronze barrel and pump tube. A different valve mechanism was used in the Model C than in the previous Model A and B. It was dubbed the "Streaks" with the Silver Streak being first with its Nickel finish, followed by Blue Streak in a black oxide finish  in 1952. The only difference between the two Streaks is the finish. MSRP 19.95 at introduction and was soon selling for $23.95 (1949–50).  
Sheridan Products Inc was acquired by its competitor, the Benjamin Air Rifle Company in 1977, thus ending the original line of Sheridan Model C's in 1976.* 
(Benjamin Air Rifle Company continued producing Model C's until 1992 when the company was purchased by competitor Crosman Corporation. Changes to the design of the Model C were made by both Benjamin and Crosman.)

Model F (1975-1990) Total Production: Unknown. Velocity: Approx. 500fps. 5mm or .20 caliber, single shot, bolt action.
     Though very similar to the Model C, the Model F is powered via CO2. With a Walnut stock and rocker-type thumb safety, this airgun is a great collector's rifle, known for its accuracy. As previously noted, in 1977 Sheridan Products Inc. was acquired by the Benjamin Air Rifle Co., also ending line of original Sheridan Model F's in 1976.
     For help in dating your model, find the serial number on the barrel. Then utilize the Benjamin & Sheridan Product Dates of Manufacture charts found at: https://www.crosman.com/discover/crosman/benjamin-product-dates

Dating a Vintage Sheridan Model C (Streak) 1949 - 1976
(be aware that changes often cannot be pinpointed exactly, so most changes will only be list by year they first appeared) Date stamps on 1964 to 1971 and serial numbers on 1972- 1985 easily pinpoint manufacture dates for these years. This change chronology is most useful for identifying approximate manufacture dates for Model C "Streaks" produced from 1949 to 1963, the "Thumb Safety" version of the Model C Streaks.

1949 - First production Silver Streak Introduced. (Sept 1949)

•	Slab sided stock (1949 only)

•	Rear sights are aperture style (1949–1951)

•	Tube stamped "SHERIDAN PRODUCTS INC. ---RACINE WIS--- on right side (1949 - 1951)

•	Forearm attached with screws (1949 - 1951/52)

•	Knurled windage adjustment for rear sight (1949 - 1952)

•	Straight end Butt stock (1950 - 1954)

•	Rear sight soldered on to barrel ( 1949 - 1955)

•	High Comb stock (1950 - 1958)

•	Slim trigger guard attached with two screws (1949 - 1959).

•	Forearm is slim style (1949 - 1960)

•	Straight bolt arm (1949 - 1960)

•	Hold-down thumb safety (1949 - 1962)

•	Sculpted front blade sight (1949 - 1963)

•	Grooved receiver (1949 - 1967)

•	Pump Tube stamped "SILVER STREAK" on left side.

1950 - One change

•	Slab sided stock discontinued.

1951 - Three changes

•	Patridge rear sight introduced. (introduced late 1951)

•	Hole on right side receiver (allows pin removal on Bolt) (1951–1956)

•       Made in USA stamped on Receiver

1952 - Three changes

•	Blue Streak model introduced (May 1952)

•	Forearm attached with roll pins. .

•	"Made in USA" now stamped on Pump tube on right side after RACINE, WIS. instead of Receiver.

1953 - One change

•	Knurled Windage knobs discontinued

1954 - No changes

1955 - One change

•	Crescent butt stock replaces straight butt stock.

1956 - Two changes

•	Rear sight now attached with set screw and two dimples, and is no longer soldered to barrel. (May 1956 - May 1961)

•	Hole on right side of receiver removed (Mid - Late 1956)

1957 - No changes

1958 - No changes

1959 - One change

•	Introduce lower comb on Stock.

1960 - Three changes

•	Trigger guard now wider and attached with Rivet and one screw. (Aug 1960)

•	Introduce new stamped lettering on pump tube "5 M/M CAL" now stamped on left side of Tube.

•	Blue Streak models now have "BLUE STREAK" stamped on the pump tube.

1961 - Three changes

•	Introduce larger "Beaver tail" style Forearm.

•	Change from straight bolt to curved bolt handle with hole on ball-end and pinned to Bolt. (May 1961)

•	Rear Sight now attached with 2 set screws. (June 1961 - May 1971)

1962 - One change

•	Hand Guard introduced

1963 - One change

•	Rocker Safety introduced. (Feb 1963)

1964 - Two changes

•	Inspection dates now stamped (backwards and alphabetically) on the left side of the receiver. (Jan 1964 - Apr 1972)

•	Front sight changed to a large forward serrated ramp style 1964 - 1977)

1965 - No changes

1966 - No changes

1967 - One change

•	Trigger guard now attached by two rivets

1968 - Two change

•	Grooves removed from the Receiver (now smooth flattop receiver). (Mar 1968 - Feb 1978)

•	Curved bolt handle now welded to bolt.

1969 - No changes

1970 - No changes

1971 - Two changes

•	Left-handed version introduced (Jul 1971) ( Approx 400 made)

•	Rear sight now clip-on attachment. (April 1971)

1972 - Two changes

•	Stamped Serial numbers introduced ( 000001 - 025650). (Apr 1972)

•	Hole in bolt handle made shallow (1972–1974)

1973 - No changes. Serial numbers ( 025651 - 060550)

1974 - No changes. Serial numbers ( 060551 - 100780)

1975 - One change. Serial numbers ( 100780 - 141460)

•	Hole in bolt handle eliminated.

1976 - No changes. Serial numbers ( 141461 - 175840)

Last year of the Original Sheridan Products Inc. produced Streaks, before being purchased by its competitor the Benjamin company.

BENJAMIN / SHERIDAN

1977 - Two changes. Serial numbers ( 175841 - 211020) - First year of the Benjamin/Sheridan Streaks.

•	"C SERIES" now stamped on left side of tube. (Apr 1977)

•	Barrel now extends over muzzle cap.

1978 - Two changes. Serial numbers ( 211021 - 257460)

•	Introduce short ramp front sight. (Feb 1978)

•	Round top receiver. (Feb 1978)

1979 - Two changes. Serial numbers ( 257461 - 308340) -

•	Introduce "AIR HOLE DO NOT OIL" stamped on bottom of tube. (Jun 1979)

•	Double sear trigger introduced. (Sept 1979)

1980 - No changes. Serial numbers ( 308341 - 346820)

1981 - No changes. Serial numbers ( 346821 - 381450)

1982 - No changes. Serial numbers ( 381451 - 401050)

1983 - No changes. Serial numbers ( 401051 - 417410)

1984 - One change. Serial numbers ( 417411 - 437800)

•	Receiver drilled for Williams Peep Sight. (Jan 1984)

1985 - No changes. Serial numbers ( 437801 - ---------)

References

Manufacturing companies established in 1947
1947 establishments in Wisconsin
Manufacturing companies based in Wisconsin
Air guns
1994 disestablishments in Wisconsin
Manufacturing companies disestablished in 1994